Dato Henry Sum Agong (born 18 February 1946) is a Malaysian politician who has served as the Member of Parliament (MP) for Lawas since March 2008. He served as the Deputy Minister of Transport in the Barisan Nasional (BN) administration under former Prime Minister Ismail Sabri Yaakob and former Minister Wee Ka Siong from August 2021 to the collapse of the BN administration in November 2022 and the Deputy Minister of Rural Development II in the Perikatan Nasional (PN) administration under former Prime Minister Muhyiddin Yassin and former Minister Abdul Latiff Ahmad from March 2020 to the collapse of the PN administration in August 2021. He also served as Deputy Minister of Domestic Trade, Co-operatives and Consumerism in the Barisan Nasional (BN) administration under former Prime Minister Najib Razak and former Minister Hamzah Zainudin from June 2016 to May 2018 and MP for Bukit Mas from November 1999 to March 2008. He is a member of the Parti Pesaka Bumiputera Bersatu (PBB), a component party of the Gabungan Parti Sarawak (GPS) and formerly BN coalitions.  He is the first Lun Bawang leader became the deputy Minister of Malaysia.

Having represented the Bukit Mas constituency, Henry Sum moved to the seat of Lawas for the 2008 election, which he won with 92% of the vote.

Election results

Honours

Honours of Malaysia
 
  Officer of the Most Exalted Order of the Star of Sarawak (PBS) (2003)
  Commander of the Most Exalted Order of the Star of Sarawak (PSBS) - Dato (2008)

References

Living people
1946 births
Members of the Dewan Rakyat
People from Sarawak
Parti Pesaka Bumiputera Bersatu politicians
Malaysian engineers